Parikkalpattu is a village in Bahour Commune of Bahour taluk  in the Union Territory of Puducherry, India. It lies on southern border of Bahour Enclave of Puducherry district.

Geography
Parikkalpattu is bordered by  Kuruvinatham, Soriyankuppam in the west, Bahour in the north, Kanganakuppam village of Tamil nadu in the east and Pennaiyar River in the south.

Road Network
Parikkalpattu  is connected to Bahour, its Commune Headquarters via Bahour-Parikkalpattu road. PRTC ply town bus to Parikkalpattu. But they are less frequent.

Villages
Following are the list of villages under Parikkalpattu Village Panchayat.

 Mel Parikkalpattu
 Keezh Parikkalpattu
 Periya Archatchikuppam
 Chinna Archatchikuppam
 Kumandhanmedu

Gallery

Politics
Parikkalpattu is  a part of Bahour (Union Territory Assembly constituency) which comes under Puducherry (Lok Sabha constituency)

References

External links
Official website of the Government of the Union Territory of Puducherry

Villages in Puducherry district